Agus Widjojo is the former Vice Chairman of the People’s Consultative Assembly of the Republic of Indonesia and Indonesian National Armed Forces (TNI) Chief of Territorial Affairs, and is regarded as one of the TNI's leading intellectuals. During his appointment as Commandant of the Armed Force's staff college (Sekolah Komando Angkatan Darat), the TNI think tank, he was responsible for restructuring the political and security doctrine of the TNI. Currently Gen. Agus Widjojo also serves as a member of the Indonesia-Timor Leste Commission of Truth and Friendship. He is a Senior Fellow of the Centre for Strategic and International Studies, Indonesia, and was a Visiting Senior Fellow of the Institute of Defence and Strategic Studies in Singapore. Gen. Widjojo is also an advisor on the Board of the Institute for Peace and Democracy (IPD), Udayana university, Bali. IPD is the implementing authority of the Bali Democracy Forum. Gen. Widjojo has written numerous articles on security issues in the Asia-Pacific Region.

References

Further reading
 Consideration of the Human Elements in the Command Estimate 
 Indonesia dalam transisi menuju demokrasi
 The Children of War

External links
 Ensiklopedia Tokoh Indonesia

Year of birth missing (living people)
Living people
Indonesian generals